Wolfgang Tillich (25 November 1939 – 23 November 1988) was a German footballer. He was the starting goalkeeper for the West Berlin-based club Hertha BSC in the inaugural season of the Bundesliga.

External links 

 Kicker profile

1939 births
1988 deaths
German footballers
Association football goalkeepers
Hertha BSC players
Bundesliga players